The State Register of Heritage Places is maintained by the Heritage Council of Western Australia. , 127 places are heritage-listed in the Shire of Cue, of which 19 are on the State Register of Heritage Places.

List
The Western Australian State Register of Heritage Places, lists the following 19 state registered places within the Shire of Cue:

References

Cue
 
Cue